Governor King may refer to:

People
 Alvin Olin King (1890–1958), 41st Governor of Louisiana
 Angus King (born 1944), 72nd Governor of Maine
 Austin Augustus King (1802–1870), 10th Governor of Missouri
 Bruce King, Governor of the U.S. state of New Mexico three times between from 1971 and 1995
 Cyril King (1921–1978), 2nd Governor of the United States Virgin Islands
 Edward J. King (1925–2006), 66th Governor of Massachusetts
 John A. King (1788–1867), Governor of New York state from 1857 to 1858
 John W. King (1918–1996), 71st Governor of New Hampshire
 Lucas White King (1856–1925), Anglo-Irish colonial administrator and academic
 Philip Gidley King (1758–1808), third governor of New South Wales, Australia
 Sir Richard King, 1st Baronet (1730–1806), British naval officer and colonial governor
 Samuel Ward King (1786–1851), 15th Governor of Rhode Island
 Samuel Wilder King (1886–1959), 11th Territorial Governor of Hawaii
 William King (governor) (1768–1852), first governor of Maine, United States

Things
 Governor King (ship), an Australian schooner launched 1803 and wrecked 1806 at Newcastle in New South Wales